The Tower is a studio album by Norwegian rock band Motorpsycho, released on September 8, 2017, through Stickman Records and Rune Grammofon. This is the first installment in the band's Gullvåg Trilogy with the second installment being 2019's The Crucible and the third and final installment being 2020's The All Is One. The album is available as double vinyl, double CD and a digital download.

The album was nominated for the best rock album at the 2017 Spellemannprisen.

Track listing

Personnel
Motorpsycho
Bent Sæther – bass, guitars, keyboards, vocals
Hans Magnus Ryan – guitars, vocals, keyboards
Tomas Järmyr – drums and percussion, vocals

Additional musicians

Alain Johannes – vocals (3), guitar (4,7), flute (6)

References

2017 albums
Motorpsycho albums